New River is a  tributary of the Santa Fe River in northern Florida, United States.  The river was used as the border to create Union County from Bradford County (formerly New River County, Florida) in 1921.

The Palatka-Lake Butler State Trail, a multi-use recreational trail that includes a portion of the Florida National Scenic Trail, will, when completed, cross the New River southeast of the town of Lake Butler. The Florida Trail currently crosses the New River along State Road 100.

An application from HSP Enterprises to mine phosphate from a  tract spanning the New River has met opposition from local residents. , Bradford County was reviewing the application, while Union County had placed a moratorium on mining applications until February 2019.

There are two other New Rivers in Florida, in Broward County and Liberty County.

References 

Rivers of Alachua County, Florida
Bodies of water of Baker County, Florida
Bodies of water of Bradford County, Florida
Rivers of Florida
Bodies of water of Union County, Florida
Tributaries of the Santa Fe River (Florida)